Cardiff is the capital and largest city of Wales.

Cardiff may also refer to:

Places

Australia
Cardiff, New South Wales, a suburb of Lake Macquarie

Canada
Cardiff, Ontario
Cardiff, Alberta

New Zealand
Cardiff, New Zealand, a rural settlement in Taranaki

United Kingdom
Cardiff (district), a defunct local government area (1974–1996)
Cardiff (UK Parliament constituency) (1542–1918)

United States
Cardiff, Alabama, a small town
Cardiff-by-the-Sea, Encinitas, California
Cardiff, Illinois, a ghost town
Cardiff, Maryland
Cardiff, New Jersey
Cardiff, New York, a hamlet
Cardiff, Tennessee, a former company town

Ships
HMS Cardiff (D58), a C-class light cruiser launched in 1917
HMS Cardiff (D108), a Type-42 destroyer launched in 1974

Sports teams in Wales
Cardiff Blues, rugby union
Cardiff City F.C., association football
Cardiff Demons, rugby league
Cardiff Devils, ice hockey

Other uses
Cardiff (surname), list of people so named
Cardiff English, dialect spoken in Wales
Cardiff University, Wales
"Cardiff", a song by Stone Sour from Come What(ever) May

See also
Cardiff Central (disambiguation)
Cardiff City (disambiguation)
Cardiff North (disambiguation)
Cardiff South (disambiguation)
Cardiff South East (UK Parliament constituency)
Cardiff West (disambiguation)
HMS Cardiff, a list of ships